Francis "Frank" Stirrup (1925  – 2 February 2013), also known by the nickname of "Mr Football", was an English professional rugby league footballer who played in the 1950s and 1960s.

Personal life
Frank Stirrup's birth was registered in Leigh, Lancashire, England. He was the son of Oliver Stirrup, who also played rugby. In 1950, he signed up for Oldham from Salford. His career debuted on January 21, 1951.

Death 
On 2 February 2013, Frank died. His funeral service was held at the St Josephs R.C. Church.

Playing career

Championship final appearances
Frank Stirrup played in Oldham's 3–7 defeat by Warrington in the Championship Final during the 1954–55 season, and played, and was captain, in the 15–14 victory over Hull F.C. in the Championship Final during the 1956–57 season. After the victory, he became the first person to Oldham skipper to lift a trophy since a victory that happened 20 years before.

County Cup Final appearances
About Frank Stirrup's time, there was Oldham's 2–12 defeat by Barrow in the 1954 Lancashire County Cup Final during the 1954–55 season at Station Road, Swinton on Saturday 23 October 1954, he played , and was captain in Oldham's 10–3 victory over St. Helens in the 1956 Lancashire County Cup Final during the 1956–57 season at Station Road, Swinton on Saturday 20 October 1956, through injury he missed the 13–8 victory over Wigan in the 1957 Lancashire County Cup Final during the 1957–58 season at Station Road, Swinton on Saturday 19 October 1957, and played , and was captain in the 12–2 victory over St. Helens in the 1958 Lancashire County Cup Final during the 1958–59 season at Station Road, Swinton on Saturday 25 October 1958.

Club career
Frank Stirrup was transferred from Salford to Oldham during November 1950, and he made his début for Oldham against Belle Vue Rangers on Saturday 20 January 1951.

Honoured at Oldham
Frank Stirrup is an Oldham Hall Of Fame Inductee.

References

External links

 Search for "Stirrup" at rugbyleagueproject.org
 Profile at www.orl-heritagetrust.org.uk
 Statistics at orl-heritagetrust.org.uk
 Former Oldham RL star dies
 Frank Stirrup RIP
 Former Oldham RL Star dies
 Past Players - Frank Stirrup
 Oldham mourn legend Frank

1931 births
2013 deaths
English rugby league players
Lancashire rugby league team players
Leigh Leopards players
Oldham R.L.F.C. captains
Oldham R.L.F.C. players
Rugby league five-eighths
Rugby league fullbacks
Rugby league halfbacks
Rugby league players from Leigh, Greater Manchester
Rugby league wingers
Salford Red Devils players